Vehari is a city in Punjab, Pakistan.

Vehari may also refer to:
Vehari District, a district of Punjab (Pakistan)
Vehari Tehsil, a tehsil of district Vehari
Vehari railway station, a railway station in Pakistan.

See also
Vehari Wildlife Park, a wildlife park in Pakistan.